Mattia Cadorin (mid 17th century) (also known as Bolnetta) was an Italian engraver and publisher who flourished at Padua about 1648. He engraved after Titian and others. His plates are generally marked Cadorin.

References

Italian engravers
Baroque engravers
17th-century Italian painters
Italian male painters
Year of birth unknown
Year of death unknown